Prize Island is a British television game show produced by Initial for ITV. The series was presented by Alexander Armstrong and Emma Willis. It was originally aired from 27 October to 1 December 2013 and ran for six episodes.

In June 2013, it was reported that ITV were considering cancelling the show before it had aired a single episode. Sources had said it was supposed to air in the spring, to go up against The Voice UK.

The series was filmed during October 2012 on Bazaruto Island, off the coast of Mozambique.

Format
In each episode, four pairs all with a pre-existing relationship take part in four game "rounds" in order to uncover a series of prizes, from a TV to a holiday package, scattered across a desert island paradise. Over two days round-by-round, one pair leaves the island, as the pile of prizes grows bigger and bigger. The final round, undertaken by the last remaining pair, is titled "Buried Treasure" and contains the grand prize of a brand new car with £50,000 locked in its boot.

Games
Below are a list of games used in the show. Most games are specific to a certain round. Bonus carnival-style games are also played between rounds, such as ring toss, to win extra prizes.

First round
Games that take place in the first round are played by all four pairs.

Coconut Superstore
Walk The Plank
Message in a Bottle
Leaving on a Jetty Plane
Net Trap
Ship to Shore

Second round
Games that take place in the second round are played by the three remaining pairs.

Shipwreck
Prize Safari
Mine Swing
Mine-O-Mite

Third round
Games of the third round are played by the two remaining pairs, who go head-to-head to get to the final "Buried Treasure" round.

Swiss Family Plumbing
Shipwreck
Coconut Superstore

Buried Treasure
The final remaining pair play for a chance to win the grand prize of £50,000 and a brand new car.

Episodes

Ratings
The first episode drew 1.5 million viewers between 5:40 pm and 6:35 pm, down 32% on the slot average.

References

External links
 
 

2013 British television series debuts
2013 British television series endings
2010s British game shows
English-language television shows
ITV game shows
Television series by Banijay
Television shows filmed in Mozambique